Angelo Rizzo (April 11, 1926, Montedoro, Province of Caltanissetta - July 16, 2009, Montedoro) was the Bishop of the Roman Catholic Diocese of Ragusa, Sicily from February 2, 1974, until his retirement on February 16, 2002. He was succeeded as bishop by Paolo Urso.

Rizzo died on July 16, 2009, in his native Montedoro of 83.

External links and references
Catholic Hierarchy: Bishop Angelo Rizzo † 
Corriere di Ragusa: Angelo Rizzo obituary (Italian)

1926 births
2009 deaths
People from Montedoro
Bishops of Ragusa
20th-century Italian Roman Catholic bishops
Clergy from Sicily